The Zuni 5-inch Folding-Fin Aircraft Rocket (FFAR), or simply Zuni, is a  unguided rocket developed by the Hunter-Douglas Division of Bridgeport Brass Company and deployed by the United States armed forces, and the French Air Force. The rocket was developed for both air-to-air and air-to-ground operations. It can be used to carry various types of warheads, including chaff for countermeasures. It is usually fired from the LAU-10 rocket pod holding four rockets.

Development
In the early 1950s, U.S. Navy engineers Naval Ordnance Test Station China Lake began to develop a new 12.7 cm unguided rocket to replace the High Velocity Aircraft Rocket.

The Zuni was designed as a modular system, to allow the use of different types of warheads and fuzes. One type of warhead had a proximity fuze, as the rocket was originally intended to be used as an air-to-air rocket. This led to its selection as the basis for the AIM-9 Sidewinder airframe in the early 1950s.

The Zuni was approved for production in 1957. A number of different launchers were tested for the Zuni, e.g. the twin-tube launchers fitted to the Sidewinder launching rails of the Vought F-8 Crusader. However, four-tube LAU-10/A series pods became the most commonly used launcher.

The Zuni was named after the Zuni Native American tribe in modern day New Mexico.

Operational history
The 5 inch Zuni rockets were first used in combat by F-86F Sabres belonging to the Pakistan Air Force during the Indian invasion of Pakistan. On 6 September 1965, a formation of 6 Sabres from the No. 19 Squadron fully loaded with Zuni rockets attacked advancing columns of the Indian army at Wagah. The rockets had devastating effects on the Indian forces and in nearly 20 minutes, the GT road was crowded with burning Indian military vehicles and tanks.

The Zuni was widely used in the ground-attack role during the Vietnam War.

This was the only MiG aircraft to be downed by a Douglas A-4 Skyhawk during the Vietnam War. Lieutenant Commander Swartz received the Silver Star for his action.

Later that year, improper handling of a Mk 32 Zuni rocket was responsible for a serious fire aboard USS Forrestal aircraft carrier, which killed 134 men. Two years later, in early 1969, a similar incident on the USS Enterprise aircraft carrier resulted in 27 dead, 314 injured and the loss of fifteen aircraft.

In January 2023, the United States announced that it would be supplying 4,000 Zuni rockets to the Armed Forces of Ukraine for use in the Russo-Ukrainian War.

Rocket motors and warheads 
The Zuni family consists out of several different rocket motors and warheads:

Student use

The Australian Government has donated its Zuni rockets to the Australian Space Research Institute (ASRI) and they are used for student experiments which are launched from the Woomera launching range.

ASRI has also designed and constructed custom nosecones and payload recovery mechanisms for the Zuni. With a payload of 20 kg, the Zuni has an approximate range of 5.9 km, which it attains in about 40 seconds, experiencing 55 G and 491 m/s (Mach 1.4) during the flight.

Laser Guided Zuni Rocket
The  Laser Guided Zuni Rocket is a precision weapon and an upgrade to the unguided Zuni rocket. The North American division of MBDA is the only manufacturer of the Laser Guided Zuni Rocket, which is similar to the Advanced Precision Kill Weapon System upgrade to the Hydra 70 system. The Laser Guided Zuni Rocket is composed of the new WGU-58/B Guidance and Control Section that is attached to the front end of an unguided Zuni rocket and warhead. The weapon requires semi-active laser energy to guide to a precise target. The Laser Guided Zuni Rocket is on the U.S. Marine Corps Aviation Weapons Roadmap and Plan and is compatible with any aircraft that is cleared to carry unguided Zunis in a four-place LAU-10 Launcher, including AV-8B Harriers, F/A-18 Hornets, AH-1 Cobra helicopters and P-3 Orion aircraft. The precision weapon fits in the same launcher as unguided Zunis and requires only a 28V firing pulse and a semi-active laser designator. The weapon was developed under a Cooperative Research and Development Agreement with the Weapons Division of the U.S. Navy's Air Warfare Center in China Lake, California.

In 2009, the Laser Guided Zuni Rocket was successfully tested against both a stationary and moving targets. The weapon successfully underwent a live fire warhead test flight in September 2010.

References
 Notes

 Bibliography

External links
 

Air-to-air rockets of the United States
Air-to-ground rockets of the United States
Cold War rockets of the United States
Military equipment introduced in the 1950s